The cruzado was the currency of Brazil from 1986 to 1989. It replaced the second cruzeiro (at first called the "cruzeiro novo") in 1986, at a rate of 1 cruzado = 1000 cruzeiros (novos) and was replaced in 1989 by the cruzado novo at a rate of 1000 cruzados = 1 cruzado novo.

This currency was subdivided in 100 centavos and it had the symbol  and the ISO 4217 code BRC.

Coins

Standard 
Stainless-steel coins were introduced in 1986 in denominations of 1, 5, 10, 20 and 50 centavos, and 1 and 5 cruzados, with 10 cruzados following in 1987. Coin production ceased in 1988.

Commemorative 
Three designs of commemorative 100 cruzado coins, celebrating the 100th anniversary of the abolition of slavery in the country (the Lei Áurea), were produced in 1988. Although very rare in circulation, the numbers' design was carried over into both Cruzado Novo and the third Cruzeiro.

Banknotes 

The first banknotes were overprints on cruzeiro notes, in denominations of 10, 50 and 100 cruzados. Regular notes followed in denominations of 10, 50, 100 and 500 cruzados, followed by 1000 cruzados in 1987, 5000 and 10,000 cruzados in 1988.

References 

 
 

Cruzado
1986 establishments in Brazil
1989 disestablishments in Brazil
1980s economic history
20th century in Brazil